Turgay Erdener (Gümüşhane, 15 June 1957) is a contemporary Turkish composer of classical music. He first studied mandolin then entered into the piano department at Ankara State Conservatory (ADK). He has taught composition at the conservatory since 1979. He is married to the Ankara State Opera and Ballet soloist soprano Selva Erdener who has premiered his song cycle Sen sen sen (You you you) and Afife a ballet with songs based on the life of actress Afife Jale.

Selected works
 Mi’den Dört Bölüm.Four Movements on E, string orchestra, 1985
 İstanbulname operetta, libretto by Ferdi Merter, 1993
 Komik komik şeyler oluyor musical, libretto by Murat Göksu, 1993
 Various works for guitar.

Film music;
 Likya'nın sönmeyen ateşi – "Eternal Flames of Lycia", 1977 Süha Arın
 Mimar Sinan'ın Anıları – based on the life of Sinan the Architect, 1989 Süha Arın

Recordings
Üç türk melodisi, Ahmet Kanneci, guitar (Boyut Yayıncılık/BMG, 1997)
Teo - adagio for Orchestra. Düsseldorfer Symphoniker dir. Rengim Gökmen (Deutsche Welle Classics: A-511673, 1997)
Sen Sen Sen - song cycle. Selva Erdener, soprano; Ekrem Öztan, klarinet; Tahir Öğüt, trompet; Ahmet Kanneci, guitar; Tahir Aydoğdu, kanun; Tayfun Bozok, Derya Bozok, keman; Ercan Gören, viola; Erdoğan Davran, cello; Bora Akyol, bass guitar; İvan Çelak, accordion (Kalan Müzik Yapım: CD195, 2001)
Obua Konçertinosu; ve Mi'den dört bölüm Taşkın Oray, obua; Düsseldorfer Kammerorchester dir. Rengim Gökmen (Carillon: 24 753)
Yeşil düşler. Şefika Kutluer, flute, Borusan Oda Orkestrası cond. Saim Akçıl (Sony: SAM P CD.30.2004444.10)
Afife. Selva Erdener, soprano; Tahir Aydoğdu, kanun; Tchaikovsky Symphony Orchestra of Moscow Radio Rengim Gökmen (Yapı Kredi Sigorta)
Ahmet Kanneci Plays Turgay Erdener Ahmet Kanneci guitar (BMG Sony – Sony Classical)
İstanbul’un ses telleri Şirin Pancaroğlu harp, Tahir Aydoğdu kanun, Derya Türkan; klasik kemençe, Yurdal Tokcan; ud (Kalan)Nereye Aşkım' Selva Erdener & Turkuvaz Beşlisi Kalan

References

People from Gümüşhane
1957 births
Turkish classical composers
Living people
Male classical composers